The 2018 Categoría Primera B season (officially known as the 2018 Torneo Águila season for sponsorship reasons) was the 29th season since its founding as Colombia's second division football league. The competition started on 10 February and concluded on 26 November. Cúcuta Deportivo were the champions by defeating Unión Magdalena 3–0 on aggregate score in the final. Both teams were also promoted to the Categoría Primera A.

Format
For this season, the league returned to the 'one tournament per year' format. The season will consist of three stages. In the first stage, the 16 clubs played each other twice, once at home and once away. Similar to the 2018 Primera A season, the extra matches against a regional rival were not played. The top eight teams after the thirty rounds advanced to the semifinal round where they were sorted into two groups of four and played a double round-robin tournament group stage, with the top team of each group qualifying to the finals. The winner of the finals was crowned as the season champions and also earned promotion to the Categoría Primera A for the 2019 season. The season runner-up would have to play the best team in the aggregate table (other than the champion) on a home-and-away basis for the second promotion berth. In case the season runner-up also ended up as the best team in the aggregate table, it would also be promoted and the promotion play-off would not be played.

Teams
16 teams took part, fourteen of them returning from last season plus Cortuluá and Tigres, who were relegated from the 2017 Primera A. The former will return to the second tier after 3 years while the latter returned after one season in the top flight. Both teams replaced Boyacá Chicó and Leones who earned promotion at the end of the last season.

a: Barranquilla used the Estadio Metropolitano Roberto Meléndez in Barranquilla as home stadium during the first half of the season.
b: Cortuluá used the Estadio Pascual Guerrero in Cali instead of the Estadio Doce de Octubre in Tuluá as home stadium during the first half of the season.

First stage

Standings

Results

Semifinals
The eight teams that advanced to the Semifinals were drawn into two groups of four teams. The winners of each group advanced to the finals.

Group A

Group B

Finals 

Cúcuta Deportivo won 3–0 on aggregate.

Aggregate table

Promotion play-off
Since the season runners-up Unión Magdalena also ended up as the best team in the aggregate table (other than the champions), they earned automatic promotion to the Categoría Primera A and the promotion play-off was not played.

Top goalscorers

Source: Soccerway

See also
 2018 Categoría Primera A season
 2018 Copa Colombia

References

External links 
  

Categoría Primera B seasons
1
Colombia